Spain have participated 4 times at the UEFA Women's Championship: Their best achievement is reaching the 
UEFA Women's Championships semi final in (1997).

Euro 1997
Spain made their European Championships and reached the semi finals.

Euro 2013
Spain beat Scotland to qualify.

Spain reached the quarter final.

Euro 2017
Spain were elimated in quarter finals on penalties by Austria.

Euro 2022
Spain were eliminated in the quarter finals by England.

UEFA Women's Championship

References 

Euro
Countries at the UEFA Women's Championship